Hyposmocoma montivolans is a species of moth of the family Cosmopterigidae. It was first described by Arthur Gardiner Butler in 1882. It is endemic to the Hawaiian island of Oahu. The type locality is the mountains near Honolulu.

External links

montivolans
Endemic moths of Hawaii